Bööler Pass (el. 611 m.) is a mountain pass in the canton of Aargau in Switzerland.

It connects Unterkulm and Schöftland.

References

Mountain passes of Switzerland
Mountain passes of Aargau